Galeyev Gallery (in Russian: Галеев Галерея) is a gallery specializing in 20th century Russian art. It was founded in May 2006 on Bolshoi Kozikhinskii Pereulok.

Exhibitions
2006:
Lev Lapin, Linocuts of the 1930s
Vladimir Kudryashev
Max Penson, Photographic Heritage 1920–1930

2007:
Herta Nemenova, Autolithographies 1930s-1970s
Alexei Uspenskii, Paintings/Graphics
Boris Smirnov, Photography 1930s-40s
Dina Khodjayeva (Penson), Photography without Second Takes
Tirsa Nikolai Andreyevich

2008:
Vladimir Greenberg
Alexandr Rusakov, Works on Paper
Eva Levina, Graphic Cycles

2009:
2 Centuries of Russian Graphics (private collections)
Vera Ermolaeva
TASS Photographers, Chronicles of the Krushchev Thaw 1955–1963
Victor Ufimtsev Samarkandia
Nikolai Ionin
Pre-war Leningrad lithography

2010:
Memorable – War-time Paintings, drawings, photographs and posters
Chingiz Akhmarov
Boris Smirnov
Moscow Collectors Club exhibition.

2011:
Savitskii's Wreath
Yurii Velikanov

 2021:
Behind the façade of the Soviet era: stories of Moscow artists of the 1920s-1940s

References 

Art museums and galleries in Moscow
2006 establishments in Russia
Art galleries established in 2006
Tourist attractions in Moscow